Avia Express was a charter airline based in Stockholm, Sweden. Its main base was Stockholm-Arlanda Airport.

History
The airline was founded in 1940 by Mr. and Mrs. Thuring in Fårösund, Sweden. It did primary work for the Swedish Airforce.
In 1945 Avia started with agricultural flights and training of pilots.
In 1984, Gotlandsbolaget buys Avia, which it owned until one year after the merger with AMA-Flyg/Salair in 1992.
In 1993 Salénia became the sole owner of Avia, which they re-branded into Skyways Express. At the same time Scandinavian Airlines shuts down Swedair and decides to buy a stake in Skyways instead.
In 2009 Skyways sales unit and operational division was separated and the operational division was renamed Avia again. The company closed down 2011.

Fleet
The Avia Express had the following aircraft:

See also
 Airlines
 Transport in Sweden

References

External links

Defunct airlines of Sweden
Airlines established in 1940